Rosenmöller is a surname. Notable people with the surname include:

  (1883–1974), German teacher and philosopher
 Paul Rosenmöller (born 1956), Dutch television presenter, politician, and trade unionist

See also
 Rosenmüller